Tireragh is a barony in County Sligo. It corresponds to the former Gaelic túath of Tír Fhíacrach Múaidhe.

History
The barony was formed as part of the shiring of County Sligo by the Lord Deputy Sir Henry Sidney.

References

Baronies of County Sligo